Dorcadion pseudopreissi is a species of beetle in the family Cerambycidae. It was described by Stephan von Breuning in 1962. It is known from Turkey.

References

pseudopreissi
Beetles described in 1962